The 2019–20 UMass Minutemen ice hockey season was the 88th season of play for the program, the 30th season competing at the Division I level, and the 26th season in the Hockey East conference. The Minutemen represented the University of Massachusetts Amherst and were coached by Greg Carvel, in his 4th season.

The Hockey East tournament as well as the NCAA Tournament were cancelled due to the COVID-19 pandemic before any games were played.

Roster

As of September 7, 2019.

Standings

Schedule and results

|-
!colspan=12 style=";" | Regular Season

|- 
!colspan=12 style=";" | 
|- align="center" bgcolor="#e0e0e0"
|colspan=12|Tournament Cancelled

Scoring statistics

Goaltending statistics

Rankings

Players drafted into the NHL

2020 NHL Entry Draft

† incoming freshman

References

2019-20
UMass
UMass
UMass
UMass